August Schmidt (1 February 1883 – 23 November 1955) was a highly decorated General der Flakartillerie in the Luftwaffe during World War II. He was also a recipient of the Knight's Cross of the Iron Cross. The Knight's Cross of the Iron Cross was awarded to recognise extreme battlefield bravery or successful military leadership. August Schmidt was captured by British troops on 8 May 1945. In October 1947 he was sentenced to life imprisonment because of war crimes committed against captured British airman. His sentence was later reduced to ten years, and in 1950 he was released due to health reasons.

Awards and decorations
 Iron Cross (1914)
 2nd Class (17 September 1914)
 1st Class (14 March 1917)
 Wound Badge (1914)
 in Black
 Knight's Cross of the Royal House Order of Hohenzollern with Swords (12 April 1917)
 Knight's Cross Second Class of the Order of the Zähringer Lion with Swords (8 September 1917)
 Honour Cross of the World War 1914/1918 (1 November 1935)
 Iron Cross (1939)
 2nd Class (1 October 1939)
 1st Class (21 May 1940)
 German Cross in Gold (6 March 1944)
 Knight's Cross of the Iron Cross on 13 February 1945 as General der Flakartillerie and commander of Luftgau VI
 Order of the Cross of Liberty 1st Class with Swords (23 August 1942)

References

Citations

Bibliography

External links

August Schmidt @ Lexikon der Wehrmacht

1883 births
1955 deaths
People from Hildesheim
People from the Province of Hanover
German Army personnel of World War I
Luftwaffe World War II generals
Recipients of the Gold German Cross
Recipients of the Knight's Cross of the Iron Cross
Recipients of the Order of the Cross of Liberty, 1st Class
German prisoners of war in World War II held by the United Kingdom
Prussian Army personnel
Prisoners sentenced to life imprisonment by the British military
Recipients of the clasp to the Iron Cross, 1st class
Generals of Anti-aircraft Artillery
Luftwaffe personnel convicted of war crimes
Military personnel from Lower Saxony